The Singapore Declaration of Commonwealth Principles was a landmark declaration issued by the assembled Heads of Government of the Commonwealth of Nations, setting out the core political volunteering values that would form the main part of the Commonwealth's membership criteria. The Declaration was issued in Singapore on 22 January 1971 at the conclusion of the first Commonwealth Heads of Government Meeting (CHOGM). Along with the Harare Declaration, issued in 1991, it is considered one of the two most important documents to the Commonwealth's uncodified constitution, until the adoption of the Charter of the Commonwealth in 2012.

The declaration opens with a description of the Commonwealth's identity, the relationship between the organisation and its members, and its fundamental goals:

The second article describes the extent and diversity of the Commonwealth, encompassing both rich nations and poor across six continents and five oceans. The third article states, at the height of the Cold War, that membership of the Commonwealth is compatible with membership of any other international organisation or non-alignment.

The next ten articles in turn detail some of the core political principles of the Commonwealth.  These include (in the order in which they are mentioned): world peace and support for the United Nations; individual liberty and egalitarianism; the eradication of poverty, ignorance, disease, and economic inequality; free trade; institutional co-operation; multilateralism; and the rejection of international coercion.

These are summed up in the final article, which serves as a touchstone for Commonwealth principles:

The part of the declaration considered the most troubling was the last to be mentioned: 'rejecting coercion as an instrument of policy'. The implication is that not even the Commonwealth itself has any right to enforce its other core values, as that would be using coercion. This apparent conflict was resolved by the Harare Declaration and the Millbrook Commonwealth Action Programme, which clearly mandates the Commonwealth to concern itself with its members' internal situations.

Footnotes

External links
 PDF Full text of the Singapore Declaration

History of the Commonwealth of Nations
History of Singapore
Political charters
1971 in international relations
1971 in Singapore
1971 documents